Paulo Afonso Falls (Portuguese: Cachoeira de Paulo Afonso) is a series of waterfalls on the São Francisco River in the north-east of Brazil adjacent to the city of Paulo Afonso.

Structure
The falls consist of a series of tiered cascades that descend approximately  before plunging  into a narrow gorge.

This would've made the falls the largest in Brazil and among the largest in the world.

History
The waterfall has been known to the indigenous population of the São Francisco River basin since time immemorial and to Portuguese colonizers since the 16th century.

Damming
In 1912, the São Francisco River was dammed by the Hidrelétrica de Angiquinho upstream of the falls. The hydroelectric dam the first hydroelectric power station in northeastern Brazil.

In the early 1940s, the Brazilian government sponsored the expansion of the Hidrelétrica de Angiquinho to provide much of the semi-arid interior with a reliable source of electricity. Construction of the Paulo Afonso Hydroelectric Complex began in 1948, which greatly reduced the volume of water flowing over the falls. Since the completion of the hydroelectric complex, the falls have acted as a natural spillway during high rainfall years.

Gallery

See also
List of waterfalls by flow rate

References

External links

Paulo Afonso Falls following heavy rains, May 2009

Waterfalls of Brazil